This is a list of companies either based or with large operations in the Philadelphia/Delaware Valley area of the United States.

Active companies headquartered in the region

Nonprofit companies headquartered in the region

US headquarters of foreign corporations

Divisions of US corporations

Divisions of foreign corporations

Defunct corporations

Corporations that moved to a different region
 Amkor Technology - moved from West Chester, Pennsylvania to Chandler, Arizona
 Bell Atlantic - after merger with NYNEX, headquarters moved from Philadelphia to New York City; a significant workforce remains in the area
 Breyers - acquired by Kraft Foods and then by Unilever
 Jones Apparel Group - moved to New York City
 Whitman's - now operated by Russell Stover; based in Colorado

Less notable Philadelphia corporations
  Burnt Toast Vinyl
  Campus Apartments
  Day's Beverages
  Yards Brewing Company
  Zivtech - software and web development

References

 
Philadelphia Area